The United Synagogue of Hoboken is a Conservative synagogue in Hoboken, Hudson County, New Jersey, United States.

History

In 1946 The Hoboken Jewish Center and The Star of Israel Synagogue merged to form The United Synagogue of Hoboken. Originally, Moses Montefiore Synagogue had been invited to join the merger, but it declined when it learned that there would be mixed seating for religious services.

Architecture

The 1915 building of the Congregation Star of Israel is among the oldest synagogue buildings in New Jersey.  It was closed for two decades before being reopened in 1989.  It continues in use by the congregation.  A thorough external restoration was completed in 2009 with the assistance of a $280,000 matching grant from the New Jersey Historic Trust.  The synagogue is listed on both the NJ Register of Historic Places and the National Register of Historic Places.

See also
National Register of Historic Places listings in Hudson County, New Jersey
Congregation Adas Emuno (New Jersey)
New Jersey Churchscape

References

External links
United Synagogue of Hoboken website

Conservative synagogues in New Jersey
Synagogues on the National Register of Historic Places in New Jersey
Gothic Revival architecture in New Jersey
Synagogues completed in 1915
Religious buildings and structures in Hudson County, New Jersey
Buildings and structures in Hoboken, New Jersey
National Register of Historic Places in Hudson County, New Jersey
New Jersey Register of Historic Places